The Native Writers' Circle of the Americas (NWCA) is an organization of writers who identify as being Native American, First Nations, or of Native American ancestry. 

The organization presents literary awards annually to writers in three categories: 
 First Book of Poetry
 First Book of Prose
 Lifetime Achievement. 

The awards are voted upon by member writers.

The Circle (along with its sister organization, the Wordcraft Circle of Native Writers and Storytellers) was formed as the outgrowth of the 1992 "Returning the Gift" Native Writers' Festival, a gathering of writers from Canada, the United States, Mexico and the Central America. The NWCA maintains contact information for Native American writers and a collection of Native American literature. The organization has been hosted by the University of Oklahoma's department of Native American Studies and is currently housed in the Department of English.

Lifetime Achievement Awards
The Native Writers' Circle of the Americas awarded the following Native authors with Lifetime Achievement Awards:
1992: N. Scott Momaday (Kiowa)
1993: Simon J. Ortiz (Acoma Pueblo)
1994: Leslie Marmon Silko	(Laguna Pueblo)
1995: Joy Harjo (Muscogee)
1996: Vine Deloria, Jr. (Standing Rock Sioux)
1997: James Welch (Blackfeet/Gros Ventre)
1998: Linda Hogan (Chickasaw)
1999: Joseph Bruchac (Nulhegan Band of the Coosuk Abenaki Nation)
2000: Louise Erdrich (Turtle Mountain Ojibwe)
2001: Paula Gunn Allen (Laguna Pueblo) and Gerald Vizenor (White Earth Chippewa)
2002: Maurice Kenny (self-identified Mohawk/Seneca ancestry)
2003: Geary Hobson (Cherokee Nation/Quapaw/Chickasaw)
2004: Lee Francis	(Laguna Pueblo)
2005: Carter Revard (Osage Nation)
2006: Luci Tapahonso (Navajo)
2007: Elizabeth Cook-Lynn (Crow Creek Sioux)
2008: Robert J. Conley (Cherokee Nation)
2009: Jack D. Forbes (self-identified Powhatan Renape/Lenape descent)
2010: Sherman Alexie (Spokane/Coeur D'Alene)
2011: Wilma Mankiller (Cherokee Nation)
2012: LeAnne Howe (Choctaw Nation)
2013: Donald L. Birchfield (Choctaw Nation/Chickasaw)
2014:  Diane Glancy (self-identified Cherokee descent)
2015:  Allison Adelle Hedge Coke (self-identified Metis/Huron/Cherokee descent)
2016: John Trudell (Santee Dakota) and Jim Northrup (Fond du Lac Ojibwe) 
2017: Duane Niatum (Klallam)
2018: William S. Yellow Robe Jr. (Assiniboine and Sioux Tribes of the Fort Peck Indian Reservation)
2019: Maria Campbell (Métis)

First Book Awards for Prose
1992: Robert L. Perea (Oglala Lakota), Stacey's Story
 Melissa Tantaquidgeon Zobel (Mohegan), The Lasting of the Mohegans
 William S. Yellow Robe, Jr. (Assiniboine), The Star Quilter (play, published in Where the Pavement Ends)
1993: Philip H. Red Eagle (Sioux-Klallam), Red Earth
1994: Gus Palmer, Jr. (Kiowa), Calling Through the Creek
1995: Glenn J. Twist (Cherokee Nation/Muscogee), Boston Mountain Tales
1996: No award.		
1997: Robert J. Perry (Chickasaw), Life With the Little People
 D. L. Birchfield (Choctaw Nation/Chickasaw), The Oklahoma Basic Intelligence Test
1998: No award.		
1999: Evelina Zuni Lucero (Isleta Pueblo/Ohkay Owingeh), Night Sky, Morning Star
2000: Chip Livingston (self-identified Poarch Creek), Naming Ceremony
2001: Valerie Red-Horse (self-identified Cherokee descent), Naturally Native
2002: Edythe S. Hobson (Arkansas Quapaw), An Inquest Every Sunday
2003: Susan Supernaw (Muscogee Creek/Munsee),	The Power of a Name
2004: Kimberly G. Roppolo (self-identified Southeastern American Indian ancestry), Back to the Blanket: Reading, Writing, and Resistance for American Indian Literary Critics
2005: Mia Heavener (Central Yup'ik), Tundra Berries
2006: Judy R. Smith (Quinnipiac/Mohican), Yellowbird
 Frederick White (Haida),	Welcome to the City of Rainbows
2007: Mary Lockwood (Malemuit Iñupiaq), Attugu Summa/Come and See What It Is
2008: Linda LeGarde Grover (Chippewa, Bois Forte Band of Minnesota), "The Road Back to Sweetgrass"		
2009: JudyLee Oliva (Chickasaw), Te Ata and Other Plays
2018: no award given

First Book Awards for Poetry
1992:	Gloria Bird (Spokane), Full Moon on the Reservation
 Joe Dale Tate Nevaquaya (Yuchi/Comanche), Leaving Holes
1993:	Kimberly Blaeser (White Earth Chippewa), Trailing You
1994:	Tiffany Midge (Standing Rock Sioux), Outlaws, Renegades and Saints
1995:	Denise Sweet (White Earth Chippewa), Songs for Discharming
1996:	Charles G. Ballard (Quapaw/Cherokee), Winter Count Poems
1997:	Deborah A. Miranda (Costanoan/Esselen/Ohlone), Indian Cartography
1998:	Jennifer K. Greene (Salish-Kootenai/Chippewa/Cree),	What I Keep
1999:	Janet McAdams (self-identified Alabama Creek descent), The Island of Lost Luggage
2000:	Karenne Wood (Monacan), Markings on Earth
2001:	Suzanne Rancourt (self-identified Abenaki/Huron descent), Billboard in the Clouds
2002:	Renee Matthew (Koyukon), Down River From Here
 Phillip Caroll Morgan (Choctaw/Chickasaw), The Fork-in-the-Road Indian Poetry Store
2003:	Marlon D. Sherman (Oglala Lakota), Wild Plums
2004:	Christina M. Castro (Jemez Pueblo/Taos Pueblo),	Silence on the Rez
 Cathy Ruiz (Cree/Métis), Stirring up the Water
2005:	Kim Shuck (Cherokee Nation), Smuggling Cherokee
2006:	Rebecca Hatcher Travis (Chickasaw),	Picked Apart the Bones
2007:	Kade L. Twist (Cherokee Nation), Amazing Grace
2008:	Steve Russell (Cherokee Nation), Wicked Dew
2009:	Rain Prud’homme-Cranford (Rain C. Goméz) (Louisiana Creole),Smoked Mullet Cornbread Crawdad Memory
2018: Yulu Elwis (Kristen Debler) (Coast Miwok/Federated Indians of Graton Rancheria), Opé

See also
List of writers from peoples indigenous to the Americas
List of 20th-century writers

References

External links
The Lifetime Achievement Awards and the First Book Competition Awards
NWCA Awards list

American writers' organizations
Arts organizations established in 1992
First book awards
First Nations literary awards
Native American arts organizations
Native American literary awards
University of Oklahoma
American poetry awards
1992 establishments in the United States